Amblema neislerii, the fat threeridge, is a freshwater mussel native to the rivers in southern Georgia and Florida. It belongs to the family Unionidae. It resides in shallow rivers in the muddy and sandy bottom of the river beds. It was named an endangered species in 1998 by state and federal agencies and it is now considered critically endangered. The mussel is usually less than four inches in length and also in its width. It possesses a dark brown to black outer shell. Its inner shell is bluish white to purple with an iridescent appearance. The shell is unique to mussels being inflated and also possessing approximately 7-9 prominent parallel ridges.

It is a filter feeder. Food particles become trapped when filtered through and are eventually ingested.

Currently the population of these mussels is declining. This is due to critical shortages in water due to violent droughts, which are destroying their habitat, within the Apalachicola-Chattahoochee-Flint River system in Georgia and Florida. Also, pollution from people and plants along the rivers, the disappearance of host fish and the introduction of other animals such as the Asian Clam have aided in their decline in population. This specific mussel has never gotten much attention due to its physical profile that blends in with the usual muddy background and its poor motor skills. Even being added to the endangered species act did not bring much attention to this specific mussel.

References

 Garber K. (29 October 2007). High and Dry in the South. U.S. News & World Report, Vol. 143, Issue 15.
 The University Of Georgia. htm.

External links 
 photo of a valve

Molluscs of the United States
Unionidae
Bivalves described in 1858
Taxonomy articles created by Polbot
ESA endangered species
Taxa named by Isaac Lea